Imbali is a township in KwaZulu-Natal, South Africa. It is 15 km from Pietermaritzburg, the capital city of KwaZulu-Natal. Imbali was founded in the early 1960s when people were moving away from the rural areas to look for employment in the city.

Notable residents
 Bathabile Dlamini - Leader of the African National Congress Women's League (ANCWL).Previously the Minister of Women, Youth and Persons with Disabilities (South Africa), and Minister of Social Development (South Africa).
 Luyanda Ntshangase - Footballer who played in the South African Premier Division for Maritzburg United.

References

Populated places in the Msunduzi Local Municipality
Townships in KwaZulu-Natal